Adrian Shergold (born 24 March 1948 in Croydon, Surrey) is a British film and television director.

Selected filmography
Danielle Cable: Eyewitness (2003)
Dirty Filthy Love (2004)
Ahead of the Class (2005)
Pierrepoint (2005)
Clapham Junction (2007)
Funny Cow (2017)
Persuasion (2007)

Selected television
Christabel (1988)
Holding On (1997)
Eureka Street (1999)
The Second Coming (2003)
Mad Dogs (2011)
Vera (2011)
Lucan (2013)
My Mother and Other Strangers (2016)

Selected theatre
Chorus Girls (1981)

References

British film directors
Living people
British television directors
1948 births